Kalichye is a rural locality (a village) in Nizhne-Vazhskoye Rural Settlement, Verkhovazhsky District, Vologda Oblast, Russia. The population was 13 as of 2002.

Geography 
Kalichye is located 10 km south of Verkhovazhye (the district's administrative centre) by road. Koptyayevskaya is the nearest rural locality.

References 

Rural localities in Verkhovazhsky District